Cerith Flinn (born 29 September 1986) is a Welsh actor. He is known for his roles as Aran in the CBBC drama Wolfblood and Gethin Pryce in the BBC soap opera EastEnders. In  2019, he portrayed Levi Rochester in Hollyoaks.

Filmography

References

External links

Living people
1986 births
21st-century British male actors
British male soap opera actors
People from Llanelli